The liard was a subdivision of the kronenthaler, the currency of the Austrian Netherlands (modern Belgium). There were 216 liards to a kronenthaler. Following the French occupation of the Austrian Netherlands in 1794, the kronenthaler was replaced by the French franc. Today, in Walloon dialects, des liards is still a synonym of "money" in general.

The liard was also a French coin, worth three deniers, which appeared under Louis XIV and was the smallest in use in the period prior to the Revolution.

Modern obsolete currencies
1794 disestablishments in the Habsburg monarchy
1794 disestablishments in the Holy Roman Empire 
Austrian Netherlands